The 1970 FIFA World Cup qualification UEFA Group 2 was a UEFA qualifying group for the 1970 FIFA World Cup. The group comprised Czechoslovakia, Denmark, Hungary and Republic of Ireland.

Standings

Matches

Czechoslovakia and Hungary finished level on points, and a play-off on neutral ground was played to decide who would qualify.

Notes

External links 
Group 2 Detailed Results at RSSSF

2
1968–69 in Czechoslovak football
1969–70 in Czechoslovak football
1968 in Danish football
1969 in Danish football
1968–69 in Hungarian football
1969–70 in Hungarian football
1968–69 in Republic of Ireland association football
1969–70 in Republic of Ireland association football